Proctor House, also known as the Cassandra Gilbert House, is an historic home located at Bel Air, Harford County, Maryland, United States. It is a two-story detached Carpenter Gothic style cottage with board and batten siding, constructed between 1860 and 1873 and enlarged about 1884. The interior features an arched slate mantel painted to resemble several colors of inlaid marble.

Proctor House was listed on the National Register of Historic Places in 1990.

References

External links
, including photo from 1989, Maryland Historical Trust website
J. Gilman D. Paul House, Deths Road, Glenville, Harford, MD at the Historic American Buildings Survey (HABS)

Houses on the National Register of Historic Places in Maryland
Houses in Bel Air, Harford County, Maryland
Houses completed in 1884
Carpenter Gothic architecture in Maryland
Historic American Buildings Survey in Maryland
Carpenter Gothic houses in the United States
National Register of Historic Places in Harford County, Maryland